The 1908–09 season was the fourth in the history of the Isthmian League, an English football competition.

League expanded up to ten teams after Bromley, Leytonstone, Nunhead and Shepherd's Bush joined from the Spartan League. Bromley became champions in their inaugural season in the league.

League table

References

Isthmian League seasons
I